Greenville High School is a public high school located in Hunt County, Texas, United States.  It is classified as a 5A school by the University Interscholastic League (UIL).  It serves the Greenville area as part of the Greenville Independent School District. In 2013, the school was rated "Met Standard" by the Texas Education Agency.

Athletics
The Greenville Lions compete in cross country, football, volleyball, basketball, soccer, tennis, golf, track, softball, and baseball.

State titles
Greenville (UIL)
Football 
1933(1A)
Boys Track 
1915(All), 1916(All)

State finalists
Greenville (UIL)
Football 
1935(1A)

Greenville Carver (PVIL)
Football 
1954(PVIL-2A)

Notable alumni
 Jay Arnold, former NFL player
John Franklin-Myers, NFL player

 Byron Bell, NFL player
 Joe Coomer, former NFL player
 Bob Gruber, former NFL player
 George Maddox, former NFL player
 Earl Thomas, former NFL player
 Mike Thomas, former NFL player
 Ed Howard, former member of the Texas State House of Representatives and Senate

References

External links

 

Schools in Hunt County, Texas
Public high schools in Texas